Far Brook School is a private, independent, nonsectarian, coeducational day school located in the Short Hills section of Millburn, in Essex County, New Jersey, United States, serving students in nursery through eighth grade.

Far Brook School is accredited by the Middle States Association of Colleges and Schools, Commission on Elementary Schools, and is a member of the National Association of Independent Schools, the New Jersey Association of Independent Schools, the Educational Records Bureau, and the Council for the Advancement and Support of Education.

Notable staff
Edwin Finckel was the school's music director for 39 years.

References

External links
School website
National Center for Education Statistics information

Millburn, New Jersey
Schools in Essex County, New Jersey
Private elementary schools in New Jersey
Private middle schools in New Jersey
New Jersey Association of Independent Schools